Royal Air Burundi was an airline from Ruanda-Urundi and was based in Usumbura.

The airline was formed in 1962 to perform non-scheduled passenger flights utilising a Lockheed L.049 Constellation N9412H, which was obtained from Las Vegas Hacienda. The national airline of newly independent Burundi made numerous passenger flights to Europe, and ceased operations at the end of 1963.

References

Defunct airlines of Burundi
Airlines established in 1962
Airlines disestablished in 1963
1962 establishments in Ruanda-Urundi
1963 disestablishments in Burundi